Marianne Marthinsen (born 25 August 1980, in Jevnaker) is a Norwegian politician for the Labour Party.

She was elected to the Norwegian Parliament from Oslo in 2005.

She graduated from University of Oslo in 2001, having studied economics. She has a somewhat diverse working background, having been a journalist in Romerikes Blad, nurse assistant, office worker and secretary of the Workers' Youth League. She has also been involved in Nei til EU, Attac Norway and Fredsinitiativet.

References

External links

Members of the Storting
Politicians from Oslo
Labour Party (Norway) politicians
University of Oslo alumni
Women members of the Storting
1980 births
Living people
21st-century Norwegian politicians
21st-century Norwegian women politicians
People from Jevnaker